Genouilly is a commune in the Cher department in the Centre-Val de Loire region of France.

Geography
The commune borders the departments of Loir-et-Cher and Indre. Three small rivers have their source here: the Prée, the Molène and the Perry.

Population

Sights
 The church of St. Symphorien, dating from the twelfth century.
 The chateau of Maisonfort, dating from the sixteenth century.
 A feudal motte known as "le Marron".
 An old priory at Grandmont-Fontblanche.

See also
Communes of the Cher department

References

External links

Official town website 
Genouilly on the Quid website 

Communes of Cher (department)